is a railway station in the city of  Shinshiro, Aichi Prefecture, Japan, operated by Central Japan Railway Company (JR Tōkai).

Lines
Yuya-Onsen Station is served by the Iida Line, and is located 38.0 kilometers from the starting point of the line at Toyohashi Station.

Station layout
The station has a single side platform serving one bi-directional track. The station building is unattended.

Adjacent stations

|-
!colspan=5|Central Japan Railway Company

Station history
Yuya-Onsen Station was established on February 1, 1923 as Yuya Signal on the now-defunct . Scheduled freight operations were discontinued in 1971. The station has been unattended since 1985. Along with its division and privatization of JNR on April 1, 1987, the station came under the control and operation of the Central Japan Railway Company.

Surrounding area
Yuya onsen hot spring resort

See also
 List of Railway Stations in Japan

References

External links

Railway stations in Japan opened in 1923
Railway stations in Aichi Prefecture
Iida Line
Stations of Central Japan Railway Company
Shinshiro, Aichi